Huntington Bank Pavilion at Northerly Island is an outdoor amphitheater located on the man-made peninsula Northerly Island, in Chicago, Illinois.  The venue is a temporary structure, with the summer concert season running from May or June until September or October.  The amphitheater opened in June 2005.  It was previously named the FirstMerit Bank Pavilion, and before that the Charter One Pavilion.

Known as the "Venue with a View",  the amphitheater has views of Lake Michigan, Burnham Harbor, Soldier Field, and the Chicago skyline.

History
The venue lies on the former site of Meigs Field. On March 30, 2003, Mayor Richard M. Daley ordered a midnight demolition of the airfield. The construction crew excavated six large X's on the runway. Daley stated the continued operation of the airfield was a threat to Chicago's cityscape, using the events of 9/11 as a reference. The airfield was set to continue operation until 2011, when it would be turned over to the City of Chicago. No one within state or city government were consulted on the demolition besides Daley. The Federal Aviation Administration fined the city $33,000, with an additional one million paid in grants.

In August 2003, construction crews were sent in to continue demolition of the airfield. Originally, the space was planned to become an aviation museum. Daley refuted the plan and proposed the space become a lakefront park and nature reserve. Within the allocated 91 acres, Northerly Island was born. Over four acres were set aside for the forthcoming music venue.

About the venue
With the new advent of the nature reserve to replace Meigs Field, the Chicago Park District proposed an outdoor music venue, similar to the Ravinia Pavilion. Construction began in December 2004. Since the venue would be located on the nature reserve, the structure would be erected in June and disassembled in September of each year. The venue was designed by Mark Dewalt of Valerio Dewalt Train Associates; costing $1.7 million to construct. The amphitheater features a 56' × 40' stage with 15' × 20' video screens on either side of the stage. It features three grandstands (totaling 3,666 seats) and a general admission area (totaling 4,500 seats). The Chicago Park District receives roughly $250,000 from the venue (through sponsorship deals) and $1 from every ticket sold during concert season. The venue opened June 24, 2005, with a concert by American band Earth, Wind & Fire.

After the COVID-19 pandemic, the venue implemented a new bag policy at their events. To reduce staff contact with guest belongings, they allow clear plastic, vinyl or PVC tote bags no larger than 12” x 6” x 12” and/or small clutch bags (4.5”x 6.5”). No other bags of any type will be allowed.

2013 expansion

The Chicago Park District originally sought expansion in 2010, wanting to increase capacity to 14,000 and attract mainstream acts to the venue. The city voted against the expansion in 2011. In March 2013, the Chicago Plan Commission approved a $3 million plan to grow the venue's capacity from 8,000 to 30,000 seats. This would mean rotating the stage to feature a lawn seating area, increasing the overall space of the venue from 4.78 to 6.9 acres. Additionally, two 300-seat grandstands were added, while the lawn arena can accommodate 22,000. There's a 12-foot slope from the front of stage to the rear of lawn, providing the proper elevation change so that the lawn can be used as a park area when not in use by the pavilion. The expansion also includes shuttle buses from the neighboring Soldier Field to help concert attendees with parking. The main entrance was widened to accommodate the capacity expansion. Delay systems for sound were added to the stage and lawn area. The original video screens were replaced by two 14' × 27' LED screens and two 11' × 17' LED screens in the lawn area.

The newly renovated venue was expected to open June 27, 2013. However, due to heavy rainfall the opening was postponed. Concerts by Dispatch and O.A.R. were relocated to the UIC Pavilion. It was opened on June 29, 2013 by Jimmy Buffett and the Coral Reefer Band.

Naming
Upon original conception, the venue was known as the Lakefront Pavilion. On June 22, 2005, it was announced Charter One Financial purchased naming rights for five years, for $2.5 million. From 2005 until 2013, the venue was known as the Charter One Pavilion at Northerly Island. With new construction underway, it was revealed the venue was seeking a new sponsorship deal. In June 2013, Ohio-based FirstMerit Corporation purchased a multi-year naming rights agreement. The length of the contract and amount were not disclosed. From June 27, 2013 until January 8, 2017 the venue was known as the FirstMerit Bank Pavilion. Huntington Bank acquired FirstMerit Bank near the end of 2016. On January 9, 2017 the venue name was changed to reflect this. The venue is now known as Huntington Bank Pavilion at Northerly Island.

Lakefront Pavilion (planning/construction)
Charter One Pavilion at Northerly Island (June 24, 2005 – June 26, 2013)
FirstMerit Bank Pavilion at Northerly Island (June 27, 2013 – January 8, 2017)
Huntington Bank Pavilion at Northerly Island (January 9, 2017 – present)

Performances

2023
Louis Tomlinson - Faith In The Future World tour June 15th, 2023

2022
Conan Gray - Superache Tour September 28th, 2022

5 Seconds of Summer - Take My Hand World Tour July 16th, 2022

Big Time Rush - Forever Tour July 7th, 2022

2017
Gorillaz
Phish - 3 Nights
Humanz Tour - July 8, 2017
Rancid and Dropkick Murphys
From Boston To Berkeley tour-August 8, 2017

2016
Fifth Harmony, JoJo and Victoria Monet
The 7/27 Tour- August 31, 2016
Pretty Lights

2015
 Robert Plant and the Sensational Space Shifters- September 23, 2015
 Farm Aid- September 19, 2015
 Counting Crows: Somewhere Under Wonderland Tour with Citizen Cope- September 12, 2015
 Rick Springfield with special guests Loverboy & The Romantics- September 10, 2015
 Sublime with Rome / Rebelution- August 20, 2015
 Yes & Toto 2015 Summer Tour- August 16, 2015
 The Smashing Pumpkins & Marilyn Manson: The End Times Tour- August 7, 2015
 Jim Gaffigan: Contagious- August 6, 2015
 The Australian Pink Floyd Show- July 30, 2015
 Bryan Adams "The Reckless Tour"- July 25, 2015
 Outcry Tour- July 24, 2015
 Rise Against- July 17, 2015
 Jill Scott- July 11, 2015
 John Fogerty: 1969– July 8, 2015
 Third Eye Blind And Dashboard Confessional- June 26, 2015
 Donny Trumpet- June 24, 2015
 Windy City LakeShake- June 21, 2015
 Windy City LakeShake- June 20, 2015
 Windy City LakeShake- June 19, 2015
 Barenaked Ladies – Last Summer on Earth 2015– June 16, 2015

2014
 David Gray-August 18, 2014
 Goo Goo Dolls & Daughtry with special guest Plain White T's- August 10, 2014
 Chicago and Reospeedwagon- August 9, 2014
 Panic!  At The Disco-Gospel Tour- July 25, 2014
 Phish- July 20, 2014
 Phish- July 19, 2014
 Phish-July 18, 2014
 311- July 11, 2014
 Soulshine feat Michael Franti& Spearhead/SOJA/Brett Dennen/Trevor Hall- July 10, 2014
 Dave Matthews Band- July 5, 2014
 Dave Matthews Band- July 4, 2014
 Ray LaMontagne- June 27, 2014
 The Fray- June 26, 2014
 O.A.R. and Phillip Phillips- June 21, 2014
 Widespread Panic- June 20, 2014
 Backstreet Boys with Very Special Guest Avril Lavigne- June 11, 2014
 Styx, Foreigner: The Soundtrack of Summer Tour with guest Don Felder- June 6, 2014
 Jack Johnson – From Here To Now To You Tour 2014– May 31, 2014

2013
 Umphrey's McGee & STS9
 The Black Crowes & Tedeschi Trucks Band
 Backstreet Boys: In A World Like This Tour- August 2, 2013
 The Bounce TV Summer Music Festival With Maze Feat. Frankie Beverly- July 27, 2013
 Phish- July 22, 2013
 Phish- July 21, 2013
 Phish- July 20, 2013
 Jonas Brothers Live Tour- July 11, 2013
 Last Summer On Earth – Barenaked Ladies and Ben Folds Five- July 10, 2013
 Counting Crows and The Wallflowers
 Unity Tour 2013: 311 With Cypress Hill & G. Love & Special Sauce- July 4, 2013
 Jimmy Buffett- June 29, 2013
 O.A.R. -June 28, 2013
 DISPATCH- July 27, 2013

2012
 The Avett Brothers- September 28, 2012
 Gotye with Missy Higgins- August 24, 2012
 311 & Slightly Stoopid- August 17, 2012
 Chicago and The Doobie Brothers- July 28, 2012
 Pitbull: Planet Pit World Tour 2012– July 26, 2012. July 27, 2012
 O.A.R.- July 20, 2012
 Furthur featuring Phil Lesh & Bob Weir- July 17, 2012
 Maze and Frankie Beverly- July 12, 2012
 Sublime with Rome- July 12, 2012
 Last Summer on Earth Tour 2012– July 9, 2012
 The B-52's & Squeeze- July 6, 2012
 Scorpions – Final Sting Tour 2012 – June 29, 2012
 Styx/REO Speedwagon/Ted Nugent- June 24, 2012
 Jill Scott with Doug E Fresh- June 15, 2012
 Jill Scott- June 14, 2012

2009
 Nine Inch Nails - Wave Goodbye Tour- May 29, 2009

2005
 Destiny's Child - Destiny Fulfilled... and Lovin' It

Filmed performances
Incubus – Look Alive, filmed July 25, 2007 and released November 27, 2007
O.A.R. – Rain or Shine, recorded June 18–19, 2009 and released January 12, 2010
Jason Mraz – Beautiful Mess: Live on Earth, filmed August 13, 2009 and released November 6, 2009
311 – 311: Live in Chicago, filmed July 14, 2011

See also
List of contemporary amphitheatres

External links
Huntington Bank Pavilion at Northerly Island – Official Site
Huntington Bank Pavilion at Northerly Island – Official Facebook Page
Huntington Bank Pavilion at Northerly Island – Official Twitter Account
Design of venue

References

Music venues in Chicago
Amphitheaters in the United States
Music venues in Illinois
Music venues completed in 2005
2005 establishments in Illinois
Live Nation Entertainment